Pierre Berault was a 17th-century French grammarian. A Jesuit, Berault converted to Protestantism in 1671 and subsequently taught French in England.

Works
 The Church of Rome evidently proved heretick, 1781
 A New, plain, short and compleat French and English grammar, 1688
 Logick, or, The key of sciences, and the Moral science, or, The way to be happy, 1690

References

17th-century births
17th-century French Jesuits
Grammarians from France
Linguists of English
Linguists of French
Converts to Protestantism from Roman Catholicism
Language teachers
17th-century French educators
French emigrants to the Kingdom of England